David Bradley (born 16 January 1958) is an English retired professional footballer who played as a central defender for several clubs in the Football League.

References

1958 births
Living people
Footballers from Salford
English footballers
Association football defenders
Manchester United F.C. players
Wimbledon F.C. players
Doncaster Rovers F.C. players
Bury F.C. players
Northwich Victoria F.C. players
English Football League players